Final Justice may refer to:

Final Justice (1985 film), starring Joe Don Baker and directed by Greydon Clark
Final Justice (1988 film) (霹雳先锋), Hong Kong film starring Stephen Chow and Danny Lee
Final Justice (1997 film) (最后判决), Hong Kong film produced by Johnnie To
Final Justice (1998 film), American television film directed by Tommy Lee Wallace
Insaaf: The Final Justice, 1997 Indian film
CMLL Juicio Final (translated as Final Justice), a series of Mexican professional wrestling events
Final Justice, the eighth book in the Badge of Honor novel series by W.E.B. Griffin
PC Principal Final Justice, an episode of South Park